Events from the year 1993 in North Korea.

Incumbents
Premier: Kang Song-san 
Supreme Leader: Kim Il-sung

Census
The 1993 North Korea Census recorded the population of North Korea as 21,213,478 inhabitants. The life expectancy at birth was of 70.7 years (67.8 for males and 73.9 for females).

Events
 1993 North Korean missile test
 Local elections
 May 11-United Nations Security Council Resolution 825 resolved that the inspector from the IAEA should go to North Korea.

Births

 Ri Il-jin

References

 
North Korea
1990s in North Korea
Years of the 20th century in North Korea
North Korea